The 1958–59 Idaho Vandals men's basketball team represented the University of Idaho during the 1958–59 NCAA University Division basketball season. Members of the Pacific Coast Conference, the Vandals were led by fifth-year head coach Harlan Hodges and played their home games on campus at Memorial Gymnasium in Moscow, Idaho.

The last conference game was a home win in overtime over Oregon, coached by UI alumnus Steve Belko.

Idaho played two home games in southern Idaho on consecutive nights in late December, both losses to Utah State, in Twin Falls and Boise, the latter at the Bronco Gym of Boise Junior College.

A notable player was two-sport star Jim Prestel of Indianapolis, who played eight seasons (–) in the National Football League (NFL) as a defensive lineman.

After the season, Hodges resigned in late April to become a high school superintendent in Anna, Illinois; he was succeeded by Michigan assistant Dave Strack

References

External links
Sports Reference – Idaho Vandals: 1958–89 basketball season
Gem of the Mountains: 1959 University of Idaho yearbook – 1958–59 basketball season
Idaho Argonaut – student newspaper – 1959 editions

Idaho Vandals men's basketball seasons
Idaho
Idaho
Idaho